Michael Parensen (born 24 June 1986) is a German former professional footballer who played as a defender for Borussia Dortmund II, 1. FC Köln II, 1. FC Köln Union Berlin and Union Berlin II. He retired at the end of the 2019–20 season.

Career statistics

Notes

References

External links 
 

1986 births
Living people
People from Bad Driburg
Sportspeople from Detmold (region)
German footballers
Association football defenders
Germany youth international footballers
Borussia Dortmund II players
1. FC Köln players
1. FC Köln II players
1. FC Union Berlin players
Bundesliga players
2. Bundesliga players
3. Liga players
Footballers from North Rhine-Westphalia